This is a list of mayors of Stavanger.

References 
Former mayors - Stavanger municipality

 
Stavanger